Harvest of Darknest is Wild Throne's debut album and was released by Roadrunner Records on October 2, 2015. The band went on a tour with Red Fang in support of the album.

Production

After releasing three Eps, the band went about recording their debut album, which was produced by Veteran producer Ross Robinson.

Reception
The album has gotten good reviews from Metal Sucks and Metal Injections. Michael Nelson of the website stereogum has lauded the album, calling Wild Throne peerless and are a band that do more than most bands in the career.

Track listing

Personnel
Joshua Holland – vocals, guitars 
Noah Burns – drums
Jeff Johnson – Bass
Ross Robinson - production
Mike Fraser – mixing

References

2015 debut albums
Wild Throne (band) albums